the film Army of Darkness
a stable run by Kevin Sullivan (wrestler)
the True Army of Darkness (Kane and Undertaker)
the New Army of Darkness (the Wyatts)